The third season of Black-ish aired from September 21, 2016 to May 10, 2017, on ABC in the United States. It is produced by Khalabo Ink Society,  Cinema Gypsy Productions, Principato-Young Entertainment and ABC Studios, with creator Kenya Barris, who also served as executive producer alongside Anthony Anderson, Brian Dobbins, Jonathon Groff and Helen Sugland.

The series revolves around Dre, portrayed by Anthony Anderson, a family man who struggles with finding his cultural identity while raising his kids in a white neighborhood. He lives with his wife, Bow (Tracee Ellis Ross).

On May 11, 2017, ABC renewed the series for a fourth season.

This is also the last season to have Yara Shahidi as part of the main cast, due to her character departing to star in her own spin-off, Grown-ish.


Cast

Main cast
 Anthony Anderson as Dre Johnson
 Tracee Ellis Ross as Bow Johnson
 Yara Shahidi as Zoey Johnson
 Marcus Scribner as Andre ("Junior") Johnson Jr.
 Miles Brown as Jack Johnson
 Marsai Martin as Diane Johnson
 Peter Mackenzie as Leslie Stevens
 Jenifer Lewis as Ruby Johnson

Recurring cast
 Laurence Fishburne as Earl "Pops" Johnson
 Jeff Meacham as Josh Oppenhol
 Deon Cole as Charlie Telphy
 Allen Maldonado as Curtis
 Nicole Sullivan as Janine
 Catherine Reitman as Lucy
 Wanda Sykes as Daphne Lido
 Daveed Diggs as Johan Johnson
 Nelson Franklin as Connor Stevens
 Lance Barber as Dr. Gabler
 Diane Farr as Rachel
 Annelise Grace as Megan

Guest cast 
 Jim Rash as Cody
 Salome Azizi as Doctor Aziz
 Chris Hansen as himself
 Andrew Daly as Doctor Evan Windsor
 Kent Faulcon as Principal Green
 Lorraine Toussaint as Almaviligerais
 Beau Bridges as Paul Johnson
 Alec Mapa as Neil
 Tyra Banks as Gigi
 Mindy Sterling as Pam
 Mary Kay Place as Dr. Barris
 Gabrielle Elyse as Shelly
 Faizon Love as Sha
 Marla Gibbs as Mabel
 Ron Funches as Ledarius
 Affion Crockett as T Will
 Bill Fagerbakke as Tom Avery
 Casey Wilson as Patrice
 Regina Hall as Vivian
 Chris Brown as Richard Youngsta
 Raven-Symoné as Rhonda Johnson
 Rashida Jones as Santamonica
 Anna Deavere Smith as Alicia
 Trevor Jackson as Aaron
 Chris Parnell as Dean Parker
 Matt Walsh as President Schock
 Mallory Sparks as Miriam
 Biz Markie as himself

Episodes

Reception

Ratings

Accolades

References

2016 American television seasons
2017 American television seasons
Black-ish